Kittisak Jaihan (Thai กิตติศักดิ์ ใจหาญ) is a Thai footballer. He plays for Thailand Division 2 League clubside Chiangrai United.

He has played for the Thailand national team.

References

1979 births
Living people
Kittisak Jaihan
Kittisak Jaihan
Kittisak Jaihan
Kittisak Jaihan
Association football forwards
Kittisak Jaihan